Pillaiabrachia siniae, is a species of earthworm eels  found in a small pool near Mogaung in Kachin state, northern Myanmar. This species is the only known member of its genus.

References

Chaudhuriidae
Monotypic fish genera
Fish described in 2016
Taxa named by Ralf Britz